Novogeorgiyevka is a rural locality (a village) in Urman-Bishkadaksky Selsoviet, Ishimbaysky District, Bashkortostan, Russia. The population was 116 as of 2010. There are 7 streets.

Geography 
Novogeorgiyevka is located 10 km northeast of Ishimbay (the district's administrative centre) by road. Bogdanovka is the nearest rural locality.

References 

Rural localities in Ishimbaysky District